The Amazing Race 14 is the fourteenth season of the American reality television show The Amazing Race. It featured eleven teams of two competing in a race around the world.

The season premiered on CBS on February 15, 2009, and the season finale aired on May 10, 2009. 

Siblings Tammy and Victor Jih were the winners of this season, while former cheerleaders Jaime Edmondson and Cara Rosenthal finished in second place, and mother and son Margie and Luke Adams finished in third.

Production

Development and filming

The teams raced in nine countries, including Romania and the Russian region of Siberia for the first time. In an interview, executive producer Bertram van Munster revealed that the teams took a 13-hour train ride on the Trans-Siberian Railway and got into a Siberian snowstorm with below-zero temperatures. He also revealed that the teams suffered extreme climates, intense Roadblocks, and less time in airports, which added up to an exhausting course for the racers. In addition, CBS revealed the season included the world's second tallest bungee jump, suffocating heat in India, and an Olympic-themed challenge that left the teams "gasping for air."

The show's route map was updated via Google Earth, and according to van Munster prior to the show's debut, the season included new graphics, a new opening sequence, and a tuneup in the musical score, as well as the use of a split screen to show several scenes at the same time. 

Season 14 introduced a new twist to the U-Turn: the Blind U-Turn, in which a team could use it anonymously; other U-Turns required teams to acknowledge their use to subsequent teams. 

Leg 10 was a double-length leg: a surprise feature of every season from season 6 to season 10. However, this double-length leg was the first where it was revealed to the teams at a location that was explicitly called a pit stop, but teams were not warned of an elimination in the clue. After checking in, teams were told "this leg of the race is not over" and were given a clue by Phil Keoghan to continue racing. This was the last season to feature a double-length leg until season 32, where it was renamed the mega leg.

Mel & Mike confirmed in a post-show interview that there was an unaired and unused Fast Forward in Leg 7 that involved purchasing items for an orphanage using the team's own money.

Cast 

One member of the cast, Luke Adams, was the first deaf contestant in the American series and relied on his mother to communicate in the competition. Margie & Luke had originally applied to be on The Amazing Race: Family Edition (along with two other family members), but ended up being one of the last families cut. Mike White had originally been chosen to participate on The Amazing Race 13 with director Jon Kasdan, but the latter dropped out before filming. The show's casting director wanted White for season 14 and he was ultimately paired with his father for the show.

After this season, Jodi Wincheski began working as a casting producer for both The Amazing Race and Survivor.

Future appearances
Amanda & Kris, Mel & Mike, Kisha & Jen, Margie & Luke, and Jaime & Cara raced again in The Amazing Race: Unfinished Business. Margie & Luke also competed in the second All-Star edition.

Outside of The Amazing Race, Jaime Edmondson appeared on The Girls Next Door and The Girls Next Door: The Bunny House. Victoria Hunt appeared on the TLC reality show Extreme Cheapskates in 2012. Mike White later competed on Survivor: David vs. Goliath.

Results
The following teams are listed with their placements in each leg. Placements are listed in finishing order. 
A  placement with a dagger indicates that the team was eliminated. 
An  placement with a double-dagger indicates that the team was the last to arrive at a pit stop in a non-elimination leg, and had to perform a Speed Bump task in the following leg. 
An italicized placement indicates a team's placement at the midpoint of a double leg.
A  indicates that the team used the U-Turn; a  indicates the team on the receiving end of the U-Turn. 

Notes

Race summary

Leg 1 (United States → Switzerland)

Episode 1: "Don't Let a Cheese Hit Me" (February 15, 2009)
Prize: A trip for two to Puerto Vallarta, Mexico (awarded to Margie & Luke)
Eliminated: Preston & Jennifer
Locations
Los Alamitos, California (Los Alamitos Joint Forces Training Base) (Starting Line)
 Los Angeles → Zürich, Switzerland  Milan, Italy
 Zürich  Milan → Locarno, Switzerland
Locarno (Church of Sant'Antonio)
Tenero-Contra (Verzasca Dam) 
 Locarno → Interlaken
Interlaken (Kleine Rugen Wiese)
Stechelberg (Hotel Stechelberg)
Stechelberg (Alpenhof Stechelberg) 
Episode summary
Teams set off from the Los Alamitos Joint Forces Training Base and drove themselves to Los Angeles International Airport, where they had to book one of two flights: the first flight on Lufthansa carried six teams and flew to Zürich, Switzerland, while the second flight on Air France departed 25 minutes later and flew to Milan, Italy. After arriving in either Zürich or Milan, teams had to travel by train to Locarno, Switzerland.
Once in Locarno, teams had to find the Church of Sant'Antonio, where they signed up for one of three departure times the next morning, at which point, teams were given a picture and had to figure out that their next clue was located at the Verzasca Dam. 
 In this season's first Roadblock, one team member had to bungee jump off the Verzasca Dam in order to receive their next clue.
After completing the Roadblock, teams had to travel by train to Interlaken and then make their way to the Kleine Rugen Wiese. There, teams had to transport four  wheels of cheese from a shed to the bottom of a hill using traditional cheese carriers and then properly stack the wheels in order to receive their next clue. Teams then had to travel to the Hotel Stechelberg, where they had to listen for a group of yodelers, who led them to the nearby pit stop.
Additional notes
The cheese-moving task was later revisited in season 22 as a Switchback.
The bungee jump off the Verzasca Dam was also revisited in season 33 as a Switchback.

Leg 2 (Switzerland → Germany → Austria)

Episode 2: "Your Target is Your Partner's Face" (February 22, 2009)
Prize: A hybrid go-kart for each team member (awarded to Tammy & Victor)
Eliminated: Steve & Linda
Locations
Stechelberg (Alpenhof Stechelberg) 
 Zürich → Munich, Germany
 Ruhpolding (Rauschberg) 
Schönau am Königssee (Bobsled Track) 
Schönau am Königssee (Holzsäger)
Salzburg, Austria (Schloss Hellbrunn) 
Episode summary
At the beginning of this leg, teams were instructed to fly to Munich, Germany. Once in Munich, they had to drive to the village of Ruhpolding and ride a cable car to the Rauschberg, where they found their next clue.
 In this leg's Roadblock, one team member had to tandem paraglide with an instructor off a mountain  to a landing area below, where their partner waited with their next clue. In the event of unfavorable winds, they had to choose between waiting an indeterminate amount of time for better conditions or taking a 60-minute hike down the mountain.
After completing the Roadblock, teams had to travel to Schönau am Königssee and make their way to the bobsled track.
 This season's first Detour was a choice between Balancing Dolly or Austrian Folly. In Balancing Dolly, both team members had to navigate Segways over a  road obstacle course in order to receive their next clue. In Austrian Folly, teams had to enter a party tent and throw Bavarian pies at a target, unaware that their target would be their partner's face. They had to take turns smacking each other in the face until they found a pie with cherry filling in order to receive their next clue.
After completing the Detour, teams had to make their way to the Holzsäger, a woodcutting workshop, and wait for the mechanical Tyrolean woodcutters to cut a piece of wood, which was stamped with the location of the pit stop: Schloss Hellbrunn in Salzburg, Austria.

Leg 3 (Austria → Romania)

Episode 3: "I'm Not Wearing That Girl's Leotard!" (March 1, 2009)
Prize: A trip for two to Manuel Antonio National Park in Costa Rica (awarded to Mel & Mike)
Eliminated: Brad & Victoria
Locations
Salzburg (Sound of Music Pavillion) 
 Salzburg → Munich, Germany
 Munich → Bucharest, Romania
Bucharest (Lia Manoliu National Sports Complex) 
 Bucharest → Brașov
Brașov (Biserica Neagră) 
Bran (Vila Panoramic) 
Episode summary
At the beginning of this leg, teams were instructed to travel back to Munich, Germany, by train and then fly to Bucharest, Romania. Once in Bucharest, teams had to make their way to the Lia Manoliu National Sports Complex in order to find their next clue.
 In this leg's Roadblock honoring Nadia Comăneci, one team member had to complete a series of moves in three gymnastics disciplines – the balance beam, the parallel bars, and floor exercises – in order to receive their next clue.
After completing the Roadblock, teams had to travel by train to Brașov and make their way to the Biserica Neagră, where they found their next clue.
 This leg's Detour was a choice between Gypsy Moves or Vampire Remains. In Gypsy Moves, teams traveled to a gypsy encampment and helped a family move from one camp to another by loading their belongings onto a traditional horse-drawn cart and unloading them at their new camp in order to receive their next clue. In Vampire Remains, teams had to drag a chained coffin to a field of stakes in the shadow of Bran Castle. There, they had to undo the coffin's chains and found several antique frames which they then had to impale by smashing the stakes until they found one containing an Amazing Race flag, which they could trade for their next clue.
Teams had to check in at the pit stop: the Vila Panoramic, overlooking Bran Castle.

Leg 4 (Romania → Russia)

Episode 4: "It Was Like a Caravan of Idiots" (March 8, 2009)
Prize: A motorcycle for each team member (awarded to Christie & Jodi)
Eliminated: Amanda & Kris
Locations
Bran (Vila Panoramic) 
 Bucharest → Krasnoyarsk, Russia
Divnogorsk (Krasnoyarsk Hydroelectric Dam)
Ovsyanka Village (Church of Saint Innokenty) 
Ovsyanka Village (Museum of The Last Bow) 
Krasnoyarsk (Bobrovy Log Park) 
Krasnoyarsk (Krasnoyarsk Theater of Musical Comedy ) 
Episode summary
At the beginning of this leg, teams were instructed to fly to Krasnoyarsk in Russian Siberia. Once in Krasnoyarsk, teams were given a 10 ruble note and had to figure out that their next location was depicted on the bill – the Krasnoyarsk Hydroelectric Dam – where teams found their next clue. Teams then had to make their way to Church of Saint Innokenty in Ovsyanka Village.
 This leg's Detour was a choice between Stack or Construct. In Stack, teams had to properly stack wood in front of an existing stack in order to receive their next clue. If their stack collapsed into the existing one, they had to rebuild both. In Construct, teams had to travel to a workshop and assemble a window frame, which they had to install in a local house in order to receive their next clue.
After completing the Detour, teams had to travel to the Museum of The Last Bow in order to find their next clue, which directed them to the Bobrovy Log Park in Krasnoyarsk.
They then had to arrange the letters to spell the name of a famous Russian playwright – CHEKHOV – in order to receive their next clue.
Teams had to check in at the pit stop: the Krasnoyarsk Theater of Musical Comedy.
Additional notes
 Margie & Luke chose to use the U-Turn on Amanda & Kris.

Leg 5 (Russia)

Episode 5: "She's a Little Scared of Stick, But I Think She'll Be OK!" (March 15, 2009)
Prize: A trip for two to Saint Lucia (awarded to Margie & Luke)
Locations
Krasnoyarsk (Krasnoyarsk Theater of Musical Comedy ) 
 (Trans-Siberian Railway) Krasnoyarsk → Novosibirsk
Novosibirsk (Punkt Tekhnicheskogo Osmotra)
Novosibirsk (Komsomolskaya Street & Voznesensky Cathedral  Stadium Spartak) 
Novosibirsk (State Public Scientific & Technological Library) 
Novosibirsk (Novosibirsk Opera and Ballet Theatre) 
Episode summary
At the beginning of the leg, teams had to travel on the Trans-Siberian Railway to Novosibirsk. Once there, teams then had to make their way to Punkt Tekhnicheskogo Osmotra in order to find their next clue.
 This leg's Detour was a choice between Russian Bride or Russian Snowplow. In Russian Bride, teams drove to a Soviet-era apartment on Komsomolskaya Street, fetched a bride, and then brought her to the Voznesensky Cathedral, where her groom was waiting. Once the team had a picture taken with the couple, they received their next clue. In Russian Snowplow, teams headed to Stadium Spartak, where each team member took turns driving a snowplow through a marked course while being directed by their partner. When both team members completed the course, they received their next clue.
After completing the Detour, teams had to travel to the State Public Scientific & Technological Library in order to find their next clue.
 In this leg's Roadblock, one team member had to choose two Russian marathon runners, who helped them warm up for ten minutes before they had to strip down to their underwear and run a  course to the pit stop at the Novosibirsk Opera and Ballet Theatre, where their partner joined them.
Additional notes
This was a non-elimination leg.

Leg 6 (Russia → India)

Episode 6: "Alright Guys We're at War!" (March 22, 2009)
Prize: An ocean kayak for each team member (awarded to Tammy & Victor)
Eliminated: Christie & Jodi
Locations
Novosibirsk (Marins Park Hotel Novosibirsk) 
 Novosibirsk → Jaipur, India
Dhula Village (Sacred Tree – Peepli Ka Pedh)
Jaipur (Amber Fort – Gaura Parvati Parking) 
Jaipur (Johari Bazar – Ramniwas Ramgopal Puppet Store)
Jaipur (Kalla Hanuman Temple) 
Jaipur (Sanganeri Gate → Zorawar Singh Gate  Badi Chopar Intersection) 
Jaipur (Jaigarh Fort) 
Episode summary
At the beginning of this leg, teams were instructed to fly to Jaipur, India. Once in Jaipur, teams had to travel to the Sacred Tree in Dhula Village, where they had to pick up one of two telephones and call one of four provided telephone numbers. The person on the line then told teams the location of their next clue: the Amber Fort.
 In this leg's Roadblock, one team member had to choose group of camels and use traditional tools to load and carry a required amount of hay to the camels, as well as fill a trough with water, in order to receive their next clue.
After completing the Roadblock, teams had to travel to the Ramniwas Ramgopal Puppet Store, where they found their next clue.
 For their Speed Bump, Christie & Jodi had to travel to Kala Hanuman Temple, where they had to decorate an elephant's face with various paints to the satisfaction of the mahout before they could continue racing.
 This leg's Detour was a choice between Movers or Shakers. In Movers, teams traveled to the Sanganeri Gate and had to choose two rickshaws loaded with barrels of hay. They then had to transport the hay  along the city wall of Jaipur to the Zorawar Singh Gate, where they had to search through the hay for a small metal elephant charm which they could then trade for their next clue. In Shakers, teams traveled to the Badi Chopar junction, where they had to don traditional costumes, join a local dance troupe, and earn 100 (roughly $2) worth of tips. They had to give the money that they'd earned to the band leader in exchange for their next clue.
Teams had to check in at the pit stop: the Jaigarh Fort in Jaipur.

Leg 7 (India → Thailand)

Episode 7: "Gorilla? Gorilla?? Gorilla???" (March 29, 2009)
Prize: A trip for two to Oahu, Hawaii (awarded to Tammy & Victor)
Eliminated: Mel & Mike
Locations
Jaipur (Jaigarh Fort) 
 Jaipur → Phuket, Thailand
Phuket (Phuket Zoo)
Phuket (Old Phuket – Nguan Choon Tong Herbs Shop)
Phuket (Pae Yod  Wat Phutta Mongkhon Nimit → King Rama IX Park) 
Phuket (Wat Thep Nimit Temple) 
Episode summary
At the beginning of this leg, teams were instructed to fly to Phuket, Thailand. Once in Phuket, teams had to find their next clue using only a photograph of a gorilla statue, which they to figure out was located at the Phuket Zoo. At the zoo, teams found their clue and were instructed to take a picture with the zoo's mascot, Esso the tiger, and then participate in an elephant show. When the elephant show concluded, teams had to return to the tiger handler, who handed them their picture with their next clue.
At the Nguan Choon Tong Herbs Shop in Old Phuket, teams had to direct the shopkeeper to open 99 boxes of herbs one at a time until they found the box that contained their next clue.
 This leg's Detour was a choice between 100 Barrels or 2 Miles. In 100 Barrels, teams had to travel to Pae Yod and prepare a fishing boat by filling 47 barrels with water and loading the other 53 barrels on the upper deck in order to receive their next clue. In 2 Miles, one team member had to pull a rickshaw carrying their partner  from Wat Phutta Mongkhon Nimit to King Rama IX Park in order to find their next clue. 
Teams had to check in at the pit stop: Wat Thep Nimit Temple in Phuket.

Leg 8 (Thailand)

Episode 8: "Rooting Around in People's Mouths Could Be Unpleasant" (April 12, 2009)
Prize: A trip for two to San Juan, Puerto Rico (awarded to Margie & Luke)
Locations
Phuket (Wat Thep Nimit Temple) 
 Phuket to Bangkok
Bangkok (Chareonyont 007 Boat Yard) 
 Bangkok (Chao Phraya River – Peninsula Pier) 
Bangkok (Street of Happy Smiles  Wat Samphanthawong) 
Bangkok (Phaya Thai Palace) 
Roadblock
At the beginning of this leg, teams were instructed to fly to Bangkok, and then had to find their next clue at the Chareonyont 007 Boat Yard.
 In this leg's Roadblock, one team member had to properly attach a propeller to a traditional Thai long-tail boat in order to receive their next clue.
After completing the Roadblock, teams had to navigate the waterways of Bangkok in their long-tail boat using a provided map in order to find the Peninsula Pier, where they found their next clue.
 This leg's Detour was a choice between Broken Teeth or Broken Record. In Broken Teeth, teams traveled to the "Street of Happy Smiles", where they had to search through 50 sets of dentures and match five patients with the correct set of dentures in order to receive their next clue. In Broken Record, teams had to travel to Wat Samphanthawong and choose a group of kathoeys and a party taxi. Teams then had to sing karaoke with the other travelers while the taxi driver drove them  through the traffic of Bangkok's Chinatown until they returned to the temple, at which point, they could receive their next clue.
Teams had to check in at the pit stop: the Phaya Thai Palace in Bangkok.
Additional notes
This was a non-elimination leg.

Leg 9 (Thailand → China)

Episode 9: "Our Parents Will Cry Themselves to Death" (April 19, 2009)
Prize: A trip for two to Barbados (awarded to Kisha & Jen)
Eliminated: Mark & Michael
Locations
Bangkok (Phaya Thai Palace) 
 Bangkok → Guilin, China
Guilin (Folded Brocade Mountains – Peak of the Luminous Moon) (Unaired)
Guilin (Qing Xiu Lu Hair Salon) 
Guilin (Li River – #24 Bridge) 
Guilin (Ancient South Gate) 
Guilin (Banyan Lake – Sun and Moon Pagodas) 
Episode summary
At the beginning of this leg, teams were instructed to fly to Guilin, China. Once in Guilin, teams had to make their way to the Qing Xiu Lu Hair Salon in order to find their next clue.
 For their Speed Bump, Mark & Michael had to wash and dry the hair of two women outside the Qing Xiu Lu Hair Salon before they could continue racing.
 In this leg's Roadblock, one team member had to direct a cormorant to retrieve fish that they had thrown in the Li River. Once the cormorant retrieved 10 fish, teams received their next clue.
After completing the Roadblock, teams had to travel to the Ancient South Gate in order to find their next clue.
 This leg's Detour was a choice between Choreography or Calligraphy. In Choreography, teams had to perform a traditional dance routine in order to receive their next clue. In Calligraphy, teams had to copy Chinese characters written by a calligrapher at four stations. Once one of the calligraphers was satisfied with the teams' calligraphy, he stamped their paper and they could proceed to the next station, which was named in the characters that they had just copied. Once teams acquired all four stamps, they were given their next clue.
Teams had to walk to the pit stop: the Sun and Moon Pagodas on Banyan Lake.
Additional notes
After arriving in Guilin, teams actually traveled to the Folded Brocade Mountains, where they had to climb to the Peak of the Luminous Moon and strike the Drums of Life in order to receive their next clue. This task was unaired, and teams were shown going directly to the hair salon instead.

Leg 10 (China)

Episode 10: "Having a Baby's Gotta Be Easier Than This" (April 26, 2009)& Episode 11: "No More Mr. Nice Guy" (May 3, 2009)
Prizes: A pair of jet skis (awarded to Jaime & Cara)& a trip for two to the Galápagos Islands (awarded to Tammy & Victor)
Eliminated: Kisha & Jen
Locations
Guilin (Banyan Lake – Sun and Moon Pagodas) 
 Guilin → Beijing
Beijing (Jianguomen Outer Street – Liangzi Foot Massage Palace) 
Beijing (Beijing Muxiyuan Sports Technology School – Guangcai Natatorium) 
Beijing (Drum Tower) 
Beijing (Beihai Street Mall)
 Beijing (Forbidden City – Northwest Corner → Dongdan Station)
Beijing (Huguang Guild Hall) 
Beijing (Huguang Guild Hall – Wenchang Pavilion) 
Beijing (Donghuamen Night Market) 
Beijing (Beijing National Stadium) 
Episode summary (Episode 10)
At the beginning of this leg, teams were instructed to fly to Beijing. Once there, teams had to make their way to the Liangzi Foot Massage Palace in order to find their next clue.
 In this leg's first Roadblock, one team member had to drink a cup of Chinese medicinal tea, endure a traditional therapeutic foot massage for ten minutes, and drink a second cup of tea in order to receive their next clue. In the event they could not bear the painful part of the massage, they could signal the masseuse to stop; however, the consequence of doing so would result in having to restart the massage from the beginning.
After completing the first Roadblock, teams had to travel to the Guangcai Natatorium at the Beijing Muxiyuan Sports Technology School, where they found their next clue.
 This leg's first Detour was a choice between Sync or Swim. In Sync, teams had to perform a synchronized dive from  springboards and score a five from both judges by hitting the water in unison in order to receive their next clue. In Swim, teams had to don swimsuits and then swim eight lengths of the pool (400 meters) with each team member alternating after two lengths in order to receive their next clue.
Teams then had to travel to the North Gate of the Drum Tower in Beijing. There, teams met Phil, who told them that the leg was not over before handing them their next clue.
Episode summary (Episode 11)
Teams had to make their way to the Beihai Street Mall, where they had to search several stores for a Travelocity Roaming Gnome, which had their next clue written on its base. Teams had to keep the gnome with them for the duration of the leg. At the northwest corner of the Forbidden City, teams had to locate electric bicycles parked across the moat and then navigate themselves past Tiananmen Square to Dongdan Station, where they found their next clue near one of the station entrances.
 This leg's second Detour at the Huguang Guild Hall was a choice between Beijing Opera or Chinese Waiter. In Beijing Opera, teams traveled to the Huguang Huiguan Opera House. There, they had to apply make-up to each other to match two models: (a princess and a gentleman). After their makeup was approved, teams had to go to the stage and bow to the master in order to receive their next clue. After completing this task, teams were required to stay in costume for the duration of the leg. In Chinese Waiter, teams had to travel to the Huguang Huiguan Restaurant. There, they had to choose a table of customers and record five orders spoken in Mandarin. Teams then had to pronounce the orders correctly to a chef to have the orders prepared and then serve the plates to the customers in order to receive their next clue. If they pronounced any of the orders incorrectly, they had to go back and retake the orders.
After completing this second Detour, teams found their next clue at the Wenchang Pavilion, which directed teams to the Donghuamen Night Market, where they found their next clue.
 In this leg's second Roadblock, one team member had to eat a plate of fried Chinese street food that included grasshoppers, beetle larvae, a scorpion, and a starfish in order to receive their next clue.
Teams had to check in at the pit stop: the Beijing National Stadium.
Additional notes
 Tammy & Victor chose to use the U-Turn on Kisha & Jen.
Jaime revealed in an interview that she and Cara were awarded jet skis for coming in first at the midpoint of this leg.
Leg 10 was a double leg that aired over two episodes.

Leg 11 (China → United States)

Episode 12: "This is How You Lose a Million Dollars" (May 10, 2009)
Winners: Tammy & Victor
Second Place: Jaime & Cara
Third Place: Margie & Luke
Locations
Beijing (Beijing National Stadium) 
 Beijing → Kahului, Hawaii
Keokea (Beach Access 118 – Keokea Beach Homestead)
Maalaea (McGregor Point)
Peahi (Kaohu Farms – Surfboard Fence) 
Waikapu (King Kamehameha Golf Club) 
Episode summary
At the beginning of this leg, teams were instructed to fly to Kahului, on the island of Maui in Hawaii. Once there, teams had to travel to the Keokea Beach Homestead, where they had to season a  pig with island flavoring and then carry it suspended on a bamboo pole  along the beach to a Hawaiian lūʻau. At the lūʻau, they had to properly cover the pig for traditional kālua cooking in order to receive their next clue.
Teams were then directed to McGregor Point, where they had to get on a personal water craft and ride  along a marked path in search of a field of one hundred buoys, where they had to search for one of four buoys that had their next clue attached. Teams then had to travel to Kaohu Farms in order to find their next clue.
 In this season's final Roadblock, one team member had to search through a pile of more than three hundred surfboards for eleven that displayed an image depicting a task, location, or person related to the ten previous legs (one from each of the first nine legs, and one from each half of the tenth leg). They then had to arrange the surfboards along a fence in chronological order based on their appearance during the season. When all eleven surfboards were displayed in the correct order, teams received their final clue directing them to the finish line at the King Kamehameha Golf Club in Waikapu. 
{| class="wikitable unsortable" style="text-align:center;"
! scope="col" |Leg 
! scope="col" |Picture 
! scope="col" |Source
! scope="col" |Nation
|-
! scope="row" | 1 
| Saint Christopher || Clue at Church of Sant'Antonio
| Switzerland
|-
! scope="row" | 2 
| Ruhpolding Gondola || Gondola Ride to Rauschberg
| Germany
|-
! scope="row" | 3 
| Gymnast || Gymnastics Roadblock Task
| Romania
|-
! scope="row" | 4 
| 10 Ruble Banknote || Krasnoyarsk Dam
| rowspan="2" |Russia
|-
! scope="row" | 5 
| Lada Automobile || Novosibirsk Lada
|-
! scope="row" | 6 
| Nose Flutist || Jaipur Pit Stop Greeter
| India
|-
! scope="row" | 7 
| Esso the Tiger || Phuket Zoo Task
| rowspan="2" |Thailand
|-
! scope="row" | 8 
| Long-Tail Boat || Boat Riding in Bangkok
|-
! scope="row" | 9 
| Cormorant || Guilin Cormorant Roadblock Task
| rowspan="3" |China
|-
! scope="row" rowspan="2" | 10
| Reflexology Foot Chart || Beijing Foot Massage Roadblock Task
|-
| Skewered Scorpions || Beijing Delicacies Roadblock Task
|}

Elimination Station 
After elimination, the first six teams eliminated were sequestered at a villa in Ko Samui, Thailand to await the finale. CBS posted short videos on its website after each episode aired in the Pacific time zone to show the eliminated teams interacting at the villa.
After Leg 1, Preston & Jennifer were the first team eliminated and were sent to the villa. They expressed their disappointment at being eliminated first and believed that Steve & Linda would be eliminated next. They also discussed who they believe are strong teams and got into an argument over the factors that led to their elimination.
After Leg 2, Steve & Linda were the second team eliminated and were sent to the villa. Steve openly complained about Preston & Jennifer refusing to form an alliance with him and Linda during the first leg, which irritated Preston. Later in the day, the two eliminated teams decided to take a trip to a local snake farm, and then went out to eat. They then predicted that either Christie & Jodi or Jaime & Cara would be the next team eliminated.
After Leg 3, Brad & Victoria were the third team eliminated and were sent to the villa. Their arrival surprised the other two eliminated teams. While recounting the events leading to her and Brad's elimination, Victoria broke down into tears. Tensions developed between Steve & Linda and Preston & Jennifer during the conversation, as Jennifer was perceived as an incessant talker, even interrupting Linda at one point. The next morning, the three eliminated teams visited a Buddhist temple, receiving a blessing of good luck from a monk.
After Leg 4, Amanda & Kris were the fourth team eliminated and were sent to the villa. They talked about what happened during the Leg, erroneously deducing that it was either Christie & Jodi or Kisha & Jen who had U-Turned them. Afterward, the four eliminated teams went to the beach to celebrate Loy Krathong.
Leg 5 was a non-elimination leg, hence no new teams were sent to the villa. The eliminated teams received Thai massages and went ziplining.
After Leg 6, Christie & Jodi were the fifth team eliminated and were sent to the villa. They first told Amanda & Kris that it was Margie & Luke who U-Turned them, which came as a shock to everyone. Tension developed between Steve and the rest of the group, especially Preston & Jennifer. Steve accused the group of shunning him and Linda, leading to an argument.
After Leg 7, Mel & Mike were the sixth team eliminated and were sent to the villa. They noted how the remaining teams on the season are becoming more competitive. Afterward, everyone went shopping at a nearby marketplace. Tension continued to grow between Preston & Jennifer when Preston became irritated with her over her buying another purse.
Leg 8 was a non-elimination leg, so no new teams were eliminated. Due to their constant arguing, Preston & Jennifer chose to spend some time away from each other. The eliminated teams spent the day snorkeling and kayaking at an island.
After Leg 9, Mark & Michael were the seventh team eliminated. Before receiving a phone call from the latest team that was eliminated, the eliminated teams at the villa went on a safari, most notably riding an elephant. Afterward, Mark & Michael called the villa to inform the other teams of their elimination and told them of the time penalties that led to their elimination. All teams agreed that they wanted to see Jaime & Cara eliminated next.
Leg 10 was a double-length leg, shown over two episodes. A new episode of Elimination Station was posted after each half aired:
The first half ended with a Virtual Pit Stop (no elimination). Elimination Station showed the sequestered teams on their last day at the Elimination Station, where the teams discussed their time together and who they wanted to see win The Amazing Race. As the eliminated teams packed for their trip to the End City, each of the teams further reminisced about their stay at the Elimination Station.
After the second half of the leg, Kisha & Jen were the eighth and final team eliminated. Elimination Station showed the six eliminated teams arriving at the End City in Maui, Hawaii. After arriving in Maui, the teams checked into a hotel. Once they checked in, they swam and snorkeled at the beach, then returned to the hotel to await a phone call from the eighth team eliminated. The six eliminated teams at the hotel were shocked and disappointed to hear about Kisha & Jen's elimination, especially Preston & Jennifer who wanted them to win. Kisha & Jen told them about what went wrong during the second half of Leg 10 and on the part where they were U-Turned by Tammy & Victor. Kisha & Jen said they wanted to see either Jaime & Cara or Tammy & Victor win, despite having been U-Turned by the latter. Kisha and Jen then told the other eliminated teams that they would meet again at the Finish Line before hanging up. The eliminated teams then shared their thoughts about the upcoming final leg of The Amazing Race, many of them expressing their shock over the fact that Jaime & Cara were one of the final three teams.
Leg 11 was the final leg of The Amazing Race 14. Mark & Michael and Kisha & Jen reunited with the other eliminated teams at the Finish Line at King Kamehameha Golf Club. Many teams believed that Tammy & Victor would win, while Kisha & Jen noted that Margie & Luke had gotten more tense with each other. Teams expressed their opinions about the final three teams at the Finish Line along with their joys and disappointments.

Reception

Critical response
The Amazing Race 14 received mixed-to-positive reviews. Andy Dehnart of reality blurred praised the reduction of time in airport, the cast, and improvements in editing and said that the season finished with "a strong end to an even stronger season." Michael Hewitt of the Orange County Register wrote that the season was "another excellent edition of 'The Amazing Race.'" Michael Russnow of The Huffington Post criticized this season's route as the show "didn’t travel in as diversified a fashion, and wherever the teams wound up they stayed in the immediate region a lot longer than in earlier years." Alan Sepinwall of The Star-Ledger wrote that his "interest in the season dropped rapidly after Mel and Mike were eliminated" and that he "lacked either an emotional investment in another team or an admiration for them as pure Racers." In 2016, this season was ranked 12th out of the first 27 seasons by the Rob Has a Podcast Amazing Race correspondents. In 2021, Val Barone of TheThings ranked this season as the show's 9th best season. In 2022, Jason Shomer of Collider ranked this season among the show's top seven seasons.

Ratings
U.S. Nielsen ratings

Canadian ratings

References

External links
Official website

 14
2009 American television seasons
Television shows filmed in California
Television shows filmed in Italy
Television shows filmed in Switzerland
Television shows filmed in Germany
Television shows filmed in Austria
Television shows filmed in the Netherlands
Television shows filmed in Romania
Television shows filmed in Russia
Television shows filmed in India
Television shows filmed in Thailand
Television shows filmed in China
Television shows filmed in Hawaii